Gopal Fun Park is a privately owned park located about 1 km from Hatkhola, Biratnagar, Nepal. The park has an area of 13 bighas (approximately 2.1 ha) out of which 3 bhigas is occupied by a pond. The park has boating, rope climbing, and children entertainment faciliteis. The park was established in December 2017 at a cost of NPR 130,000,000.

Notable Events
In January 2019, an Indian actress Rakhi Sawant performed in this park along with other local artists.

External links
official website

References

Amusement parks in Nepal
2017 establishments in Nepal